Sanousi Hawsawi (born 8 August 1998) is a Saudi Arabian professional footballer who plays as a right back for Saudi Professional League side Al-Ettifaq.

Career
Hawsawi started his career at the youth team of Ohod and represented the club at every level. On 22 January 2016, joined youth team of Al-Ahli, On 29 July 2018, joined Al-Jabalain, On 1 October 2020, joined Al-Ettifaq,

References

External links
 

1998 births
Living people
Saudi Arabian footballers
Association football fullbacks
Ohod Club players
Al-Ahli Saudi FC players
Al-Jabalain FC players
Ettifaq FC players
Saudi Second Division players
Saudi First Division League players
Saudi Professional League players